Stylianós Vlavianós, often called Stélios Vlavianós, (born 7 July 1947) is a Greek composer, musical arranger, a member of the Sacem and the SACD, among others.

Biography 
Vlavianós was born in Athens. His musical apprenticeship began at the age of 3 with his father Stefanos Vlavianos, a musician with the Athens Radio Orchestra (trombonist) and an eclectic theorist.

At the age of 10, he entered the Greek National Conservatory in Maria Hatjopoulou's piano class. 
 
He was later a student with French composer Pierre Petit, then director of the École Normale de Musique de Paris. The master taught him counterpoint, fugue, harmony, composition, orchestration for more than a dozen years before dying prematurely.

In the 1970s, he composed songs for artists such as Demis Roussos, Shirley Bassey, Engelbert Humperdinck, and Al Martino.
 
His song Forever and Ever was a world success.
 
1978: He published a book entitled "Guide on Orchestration and Instrumentation". published by Chappel.
 
In New York, he also composed experimental music pieces with Fred Lipsius (saxophonist and clarinetist, founding member of the band Blood, Sweat and Tears).

In 2007, French pianist Yves Henry, Prix Schumann and teacher at the Conservatoire de Paris, played some of his pieces for piano.
 
He also composed the music for Les Fabuleuses Aventures d'Ulysse, performed by the Greek tragedian Angela Sonne in several theatres in France.
 
In 1999, the choreographer Blanca Li used a large extract from his book Impressions of Greece for her show Le Songe du minotaure.

References 

Lexique de la Musique Grecque (Takis Kalogeropoulos - Éditions Gialleli - ) pages 374 and 375, in addition to the "Oxford Musical Lexicon". (Éditions Gialleli, 1993).

External links 
 Discography on Discogs
 Stylianós Vlavianós on All Music
 Stélios Vlavianós_Souvenirs, arr. Andrey Shilov (YouTube)

1947 births
Living people
Musicians from Athens
École Normale de Musique de Paris alumni
Greek composers
Music arrangers